Lesbian, gay, bisexual, and transgender (LGBT) people in Slovakia face legal challenges not experienced by non-LGBT residents. Both male and female same-sex sexual activity are legal in Slovakia, but households headed by same-sex couples are not eligible for the same legal protections available to opposite-sex couples. While Slovakia grants same-sex couples limited legal rights, namely in the area of inheritance, the country does not recognize same-sex marriage or civil unions . Slovakia, unlike its neighbour, the Czech Republic, holds more conservative views on issues dealing with LGBT rights. 

Slovakia however possesses comprehensive anti-discrimination laws covering sexual orientation and gender identity, among others, in areas such as employment, goods and services, education, health services, hate crimes and hate speech. LGBT people are allowed to serve openly in the Slovak Armed Forces. Additionally, attitudes towards members of the LGBT community are gradually becoming more accepting, in line with worldwide trends. A 2007 poll showed that two-thirds of Slovaks believe that homosexuality should be accepted by society, while another Pew Research Center poll from 2017 showed evenly split support for same-sex marriage. Opinion polls have reported fluctuating trends in support for same-sex marriage and civil unions, with polls showing different levels of Slovaks in support and opposition regarding registered partnerships and marriages as of 2019.

Since 2022, transgender people in Slovakia have been experiencing difficulty in accessing transgender healthcare, forcing them to look for options abroad, and lack of regulation has proven to be a difficulty for transgender people when it comes to their right to change their legal gender, where some civil registries refuse to change their legal gender, citing lack of regulation. On March 3, 2023, the once suspended new standards of care have been republished however, the impact of it remains to be seen.

Law regarding same-sex sexual activity
Same-sex sexual activity was legalized in 1962, after scientific research from Kurt Freund led to some changes to public opinion (see the history of penile plethysmographs). The age of consent was equalized in 1990 to 15, as it had previously been 18 for same-sex couples.

Recognition of same-sex relationships

Unregistered cohabitation
Since 2018, Slovak law has recognised a "close person", defined as a sibling or a spouse. A family member or a person in a relationship shall be considered under law a "close person" if an injury suffered by one of them is "reasonably felt by the other person as an injury suffered by him or her." Only limited rights are granted, namely in the area of inheritance.

Registered partnerships
, there is no legal recognition of registered partnerships in Slovakia, although several bills to legalize registered partnerships for same-sex couples were introduced in 1997, 2000, 2012, 2018 and 2021. In 2008 and 2009, the LGBT rights group Iniciatíva Inakosť (Otherness Initiative) launched a public awareness campaign for the recognition of registered life partnerships between same-sex couples. In January 2008, LGBT rights activists met with the Deputy Prime Minister, Dušan Čaplovič, to discuss this proposal. Throughout 2008, Iniciatíva Inakosť also held a number of public discussions about registered partnerships. The Slovak Green Party supports registered partnerships for same-sex and opposite-sex couples. In March 2012, the liberal Freedom and Solidarity (SaS) party announced that it would submit a draft law on registered partnerships. On 23 August, the registered partnership bill was submitted to Parliament, which would have given same-sex couples similar rights and obligations as married couples, including alimony, inheritance, access to medical documentation and the right to a widow's/widower's pension, but excluding adoption rights. On 19 September, the ruling party, Direction - Social Democracy (Smer) announced that it would vote against the bill, which was later rejected by 14–94.

In August 2017, Deputy Speaker of the National Council Lucia Ďuriš Nicholsonová of SaS promised to re-submit draft legislation on registered partnerships to Parliament. On 11 December 2017, following a meeting with Iniciatíva Inakosť representatives, President Andrej Kiska called for a public debate about the rights of same-sex couples. On the same day, SaS reiterated its intention to introduce a registered partnership bill. SaS introduced its registered partnership bill to the National Council in July 2018. Under the proposed bill, partnerships would have been open to both same-sex and opposite-sex couples and would have granted couples several rights and benefits enjoyed by married couples, namely in the area of inheritance and healthcare, among others. The bill was defeated in September 2018, with only 31 out of 150 lawmakers in support.

In 2021, the Progressive Slovakia party introduced the life partnership bill, but it was rejected in a 7-67 vote.

Same-sex marriage
, there is no domestic legal recognition of same-sex marriages in Slovakia, although same-sex marriages established abroad are recognized in Slovak law, and are allowed to settle and live in Slovakia. In January 2014, the Christian Democratic Movement (KDH) announced that it would submit a draft law to prohibit same-sex marriage in the Slovak Constitution. In February 2014, Minister of Culture Marek Maďarič said there were enough SMER-SD MPs in favour of the constitutional ban for it to pass. 40 opposition MPs introduced a draft law to the National Council to ban same-sex marriage in the Slovak Constitution. Prime Minister Robert Fico stated that the governing SMER-SD would be willing to support the amendment in exchange for the opposition's support for an amendment introducing changes in the judicial system. The bill passed its first reading in a 103–5 vote in March 2014. The amendment could cause any future laws recognising same-sex couples to be unconstitutional. In June 2014, it was passed and signed into law by President Ivan Gašparovič, with 102 MPs voting for and 18 against. Article 41 reads as follows:

In December 2013, a conservative civil initiative group named Aliancia za rodinu (Alliance for the Family) announced that it would demand a constitutional definition of marriage as "a union solely between a man and a woman". The Alliance intended to initiate referendums on several issues, and demanded a ban on same-sex adoption and the prohibition of sex education in schools. They also demanded that other types of cohabitation should never be held equal to a marriage between a man and a woman. Activists from the Alliance also criticised Swedish company Ikea for its corporate magazine, which featured two lesbians raising a son.

In August 2014, Aliancia za rodinu collected more than 400,000 signatures for a petition to hold a referendum on four questions:

 Do you agree that no other cohabitation of persons other than a bond between one man and one woman can be called marriage?
 Do you agree that same-sex couples or groups shouldn't be allowed to adopt children and subsequently raise them?
 Do you agree that no other cohabitation of persons other than marriage should be granted particular protection, rights and duties that the legislative norms as of 1 March 2014 only grant to marriage and to spouses (mainly acknowledgement, registration, or recording as a life community in front of a public authority, the possibility to adopt a child by the spouse of a parent)?
 Do you agree that schools cannot require children to participate in education pertaining to sexual behaviour or euthanasia if their parents or the children themselves do not agree with the content of the education?

President Andrej Kiska asked the Constitutional Court to consider the proposed questions. In October 2014, the Constitutional Court ruled that the third question was unconstitutional.

A referendum on the other three questions was held on 7 February 2015. All three proposals were approved, but the referendum was declared invalid due to insufficient turnout (21.07%). The referendum required a 50% turnout to be valid. Opponents, including LGBT activists, advised voters to boycott the referendum.

On 5 June 2018, in Coman and Others v General Inspectorate for Immigration and Ministry of the Interior, the European Court of Justice ruled in favour of a Romanian-American same-sex couple who sought to have their marriage recognized in Romania, so that the American partner could reside in the country. The Court ruled that EU member states may choose whether or not to allow same-sex marriage, but they cannot obstruct the freedom of residence of an EU citizen and their spouse. Furthermore, the Court ruled that the term "spouse" is gender-neutral, and that it does not necessarily imply a person of the opposite sex. Same-sex couples resident in Slovakia who have married in member states that have legalized same-sex marriage, and where one partner is an EU citizen, enjoy full residency rights as a result of the ruling. The Slovak Interior Ministry quickly announced immediate compliance with the ruling. The European Court of Justice's landmark ruling was praised by the International Lesbian, Gay, Bisexual, Trans and Intersex Association (ILGA) and other human rights groups, while the Slovak Catholic Church condemned it.

Adoption and family planning
Slovak law allows any person to adopt. However, persons who are not married to each other may not adopt the same child. This means that for unmarried couples only one partner may adopt a child.

Discrimination protections
The Anti-Discrimination Act was adopted in 2004, in requirement with European Union protocols on anti-discrimination in its member states. The Act, broadened in 2008, made it illegal to discriminate on the basis of sexual orientation and "gender identification" in a wide variety of areas, including employment, education, housing, social care and the provision of goods and services. Article 2 of the law reads as follows:

In May 2013, the Criminal Code was amended to include sexual orientation as a ground for hate crimes, allowing penalty enhancements where a crime is motivated by homophobia. Additionally, hate speeches on the basis of sexual orientation are outlawed.

Military service
In 2005, Pravda reported that "The military also has a very homophobic environment that is hostile and intolerant of any manifestations and indications of homosexuality." The Constitution of the Slovak Republic and the Anti-Discrimination Law  prohibit discrimination on the basis of sexual orientation and apply to the military.

Gender identity and expression
Transgender people in Slovakia have been allowed to change legal gender since 1995. The law allowing it doesn't directly regulate the requirements, but in practice, it's usually required to undergo surgical sterilization. There have been exceptional cases where change of legal gender was possible even without castration. Because there's no recognition for same-sex marriages, any existing marriage will be invalidated.

In 2021, members of far-right neo-Nazi parties have introduced two bills that would ban change of legal gender in Slovakia, once by People's Party Our Slovakia in February 12, 2021, and the second time by the party Republic in September 23, 2021. Both attempts have been unsuccessful, with majority votes being absentee or abstaining.

On April 6, 2022, the  has published the standards of care for transgender people that also regulated medical transition and the conditions of granting the ability to change the legal gender by appointed experts, where an appointed expert is any doctor in the field of psychiatry or sexology with at least five years of professional experience, and the person requesting documentation necessary for the legal gender change must be either surgically castrated or undergoing the real-life experience test in combination with the hormone replacement therapy for at least a year, unless HRT is contraindicated.

However, after strong pressure by many conservatives, the Conference of Slovak Bishops, and members of the National Council, both coalition and opposition, including the Prime Minister of Slovakia Eduard Heger, the standards of care have been revoked on May 18, 2022, and since then, there are no valid standards when it comes to transgender care and legal change of gender in Slovakia. On November 16, 2022, in an interview for Denník N, the head of an LGBT non-governmental organisation  has claimed the attempts of approving the standards of care are being blocked by members of the Ordinary People coalition party.

On October 19, 2022, the Supreme Court of Slovakia overturned the decision of the  who has ruled that undergoing surgical sterilization is required in order to change the legal gender, and has confirmed the law doesn't directly specify any requirements in order to change the legal gender.

As of November 18, 2022, because of lack of regulation and standards, healthcare providers in Slovakia are refusing to provide transgender care, which forces trans people living in Slovakia to seek healthcare abroad, and some civil registry offices are refusing to process any applications to change legal gender, citing lack of regulation and telling them to wait for approval of the new standards of care by the Ministry of Health, meaning change of legal gender is close to impossible to achieve.

On March 3, 2023, the once suspended standards of care for transgender people have been republished. However, the impact of the standards in regards to access to the care and acceptance by the civil registries remains to be seen.

Blood donation
Gay and bisexual people are prohibited from donating blood if they have had unprotected sexual intercourse within one year.

Living conditions

Slovakia's first gay pride event took place on 22 May 2010 in Bratislava. A crowd of about a thousand were confronted by anti-gay right-wing groups. While the National and Bratislava's municipal police forces kept the two sides apart, several anti-gay protesters were able to infiltrate the event and throw stones at speakers and disperse tear gas into the crowd. Pride demonstrators had to cancel their march through the city centre, but were able to cross the Danube under police protection. Twenty-nine persons were arrested. The event has since improved its security measures and it has been supported by many foreign embassies.

There is a small gay scene in Slovakia with a few bars and clubs in Bratislava.

Public opinion and demographics

Public opinion has been fluctuating in Slovakia in the past few decades, initially becoming more favourable to granting rights to same-sex couples, then began stagnating by the end of 2010s as a result of a coordinated homophobic campaign by conservative politicians. A 2007 Pew Global Attitudes Project survey recorded that 66% of Slovaks believed that homosexuality should be accepted by society. According to a poll conducted in 2009, 45% of respondents supported same-sex registered partnerships, 41% were opposed, and 14% were unsure. Support for specific rights was higher, with 56% supporting the right of same-sex couples to jointly own property, 72% to access medical information about their partner and 71% supporting the right to bereavement leave.

Support for same-sex marriage remains low compared to other European Union member states. A 2006 European Union poll showed that 19% of Slovaks supported same-sex marriage,  
and the 2015 Eurobarometer found that 24% of Slovaks supported same-sex marriage, the fourth lowest among EU member states alongside Lithuania. EU-wide support was 61%. However, a 2015 survey by AKO found that more than 50.4% of Slovaks would vote in favor of same-sex registered partnerships. A 2016 opinion poll conducted by FOCUS found that more than 27% of Slovaks supported same-sex marriage, an increase of 3% since 2015.

An LGBT social network called PlanetRomeo released its first Gay Happiness Index in May 2015. Gay men from more than 120 nations were surveyed to learn how they felt about society's perception of homosexuality, how they felt about how others treated them, and how content they were with their life. Slovakia was ranked 47th, far behind neighboring Czechia – 18th and Austria, 17th.

In 2017, Iniciatíva Inakosť conducted a survey enquiring into the lives of Slovak LGBT people. The survey found that 52% were irreligious, while 33% were Roman Catholics, 6% were Evangelicals and 2% were Greek Orthodox. However, 56.5% considered religion "important" in their lives. When divided by political ideology, 58.5% considered themselves either "very liberal" or "liberal". Only 2.5% considered themselves "conservative", and 18% said they were "centrist".  Progressive Slovakia and Freedom and Solidarity were the most popular political parties among LGBT people. With regards to coming out, most respondents said it had been "positive". 71% and 52% of sisters and brothers respectively were accepting of their disclosure of lesbian, gay, and bisexual orientation. 54% of mothers, 42% of fathers and 49.5% of grandparents responded the same, and a significant number, including 28.5% of fathers and 29% of grandparents, were indifferent. Furthermore, 78% of respondents considered their relationship with their partner as "serious", but less than half were willing to hold their hand in public. Many respondents reported low self-esteem, anxiety, depression, alcohol abuse and suicidal feelings as a result of homophobic persecution, and nearly 40% of the respondents have experienced active discrimination because of their LGBT identity, with 15.2% of LGBT people experiencing it in the last year.

According to a 2017 Pew Research Center poll, 47% of Slovaks supported same-sex marriage, while another 47% were opposed and 6% were undecided. This was the highest level of support ever recorded, and the second highest among Eastern European countries, behind the Czech Republic at 65%. Among 18-34-year-olds, opposition to same-sex marriage was 42%. A 2019 survey conducted by the AKO polling agency found that 57% of Slovaks were in favour of registered partnerships for everyone, in contrast to a poll made by the FOCUS agency, which has found support for registered partnerships at 29%, a figure that was criticized by commentators and LGBT rights activists as an unusually low number, and they have questioned the strength and credibility of the poll's methodology.

Summary table

See also

LGBT rights in Europe
 LGBT rights in the European Union
 2022 Bratislava shooting

Notes

References

Further reading